Fencing at the 2015 Southeast Asian Games was held in OCBC Arena Hall 2, in Kallang, Singapore from 3 to 7 June 2015. Medals were awarded in six disciplines for both men and women competitions.

Participating nations
A total of 162 athletes from 10 nations competed in fencing at the 2015 Southeast Asian Games:

Competition schedule
The following was the competition schedule for the fencing competitions:

Medalists

Men

Women

Medal table

References

 
Kallang